Manmadhudu 2 is a 2019 Indian Telugu-language romantic comedy film directed by Rahul Ravindran. It is produced by Nagarjuna and P. Kiran under Annapurna Studios, Anandi Art Creations and Viacom18 Studios. It stars Nagarjuna and Rakul Preet Singh, with music composed by Chaitan Bharadwaj. The film is an official remake of the French film I Do (2006) and is a spiritual successor to Nagarjuna's Manmadhudu (2002).

Plot
Samba Siva Rao / Sam is an aged bachelor and a perfumer by profession who lives in Portugal, creator of Gucci Bloom. In his youth, a breakup with Suma (Keerthy Suresh) due to the traditional harassment of his family makes him averse to the concept of marriage and pushes him to believe in flings. However, his family consisting of his mother (Lakshmi) and three sisters - Swarnalatha (Jhansi), Sangeetha (Devadarshini), and Swetha (Nishanthi Evani) - give an ultimatum to enter wedlock within three months. In order to solve the problem, Sam enters into a contract and hires a young girl named Avantika (Rakul Preet Singh) to act as his fiancé for a few weeks and ditch him on the wedding day so that his family will leave him alone. As Avantika, wants to adopt her deceased sister's son for which a bank balance is obligatory as per Portuguese rules, she also agrees. However, the situation changes when Sam's family gets emotionally closer to Avantika and even she too. According to the plan, Avantika absconds. As a result, Sam's mother collapses with a heart attack. To rescue her from danger, Sam again hires Avantika with Plan B: to act horribly towards the family so that they do not like her anymore. In that process, Avantika shifts to Sam's residence when the two start liking each other, but Sam maintains silence because of the age gap. A grief-stricken Avantika successfully completes their contract and takes off. At last, Sam stands up to his family, confesses his schemes, and expresses his love for Avantika, which she overhears and comes back. Finally, the movie ends on a happy note with the marriage of Sam and Avantika and the coulpe adopting Avanthika's nephew.

Cast 
 Nagarjuna Akkineni as Samba Siva Rao a.k. a. Sam
 Rakul Preet Singh as Avantika
 Rao Ramesh as Attharu Pushparaju, Sam's maternal uncle
 Vennela Kishore as Kishore, Sam's PA
 Lakshmi as Sam's mother
 Rohini as Janani, NGO director
 Jhansi as Swarnalatha, Sam's elder sister 
 Devadarshini as Sangeetha, Sam's elder sister
 Nishanthi Evani as Swetha, Sam's younger sister

Cameo appearances
 Samantha Ruth Prabhu as the girl who Sam meets at a bridge
 Keerthy Suresh as Suma, Sam's ex-girlfriend
 Akshara Gowda as Akshara, the girl whom Sam meets at the bar
 Brahmanandam as Suribabu Lavangam
 Sudhanshu Pandey as Amit, Avantika’s sadistic ex-boyfriend
 Sri Satya as Avantika's sister

Production 
The film is being produced by Annapurna Studios, Anandi Art Creations and Viacom18 Motion Pictures. 
Movie launched on March 25, 2019 with a formal puja ceremony in Annapurna Studios, Hyderabad. Naga Chaitanya, Amala Akkineni, Sumanth and Sushanth has graced the event.
After filming some important scenes in some locations at Portugal, the team wrapped up the schedule and returned to Hyderabad.

Soundtrack 

Music composed by Chaitan Bharadwaj, and released on Aditya Music label.

Release 
The movie was released on 9 August 2019.

Reception

Critical reception 
The Times of India gave 3.5 out of 5 stars stating "The director missed a trick or two with the climax but gets almost everything else bang on, ensuring a hilarious entertainer that you wouldn't mind watching on repeat. Too much of something can be an overkill, they often say. But when it comes to Vennela Kishore's comedy in Manmadhudu 2, that doesn't ring true. In fact, it only leaves you wanting for more". India Today gave 3.5 out of 5 stars stating "Manmadhudu 2, directed by Rahul Ravindran, aims to be a breezy entertainer but it barely scratches the surface. Witty one-liners and a handful of neatly crafted moments are the only takeaways from Manmadhudu 2". Firstpost gave 3.5 out of 5 stars stating "This could have been a meaningful drama about toxic relationships, but Rahul Ravindran does not quite dig deep into that aspect of the film. This could also have been a film about a man who is afraid of breakups because that seems more unbearable than being lonely, but we do not see enough of that. This could have been about a family trying to make Sam understand the meaning of happiness and companionship, but all we get to see is a bunch of them trying all sorts of things to convince Sam, except for pouring their hearts out to him directly. Manmadhudu 2 could have been so much more than what it is but it ends up nowhere".

The Indian Express gave 3 out of 5 stars stating "Rahul Ravindran has not set this story in a perfect world. The hero’s family is regressive in its thinking even as all of them seem lovely. The hero is a womanizer. Sam also seems to enjoy trips to strip clubs and so on. And yet, the film is not crass. It is an imperfect world and we should accept something good even if we find it in the most unlikely places". The New Indian Express gave 3.5 out of 5 stars stating "Save for a few comic sequences provided by Vennela Kishore, Manmadhudu 2 is a bumpy ride that struggles to take off at the right time. The convoluted plot devoid of the emotional arc makes it a dreary affair". The News Minute gave 2 out of 5 stars stating "The film has its moments but holds itself back too much and Nagarjuna's character, especially, needs more work".

Sangeetha Devi Dundoo of The Hindu wrote "Manmadhudu 2 doesn’t live up to that promise and here’s hoping that with the next one, Rahul will be back in form". Hindustan Times gave 3.5 out of 5 stars stating "Despite decent performances by the film’s lead cast, Nagarjuna and Rakul Preet Singh, the film’s writing is a huge let down. Except for a couple of funny one-liners, the film is a disgrace and shouldn’t belong to the world of Manmadhudu". Deccan Chronicle gave 3.5 out of 5 stars stating "Manmadhudu 2 is a big blunder from Nagarjuna, who bought the remake rights of the French film. He spoke very highly about this film but it does not come to pass. The film’s leading lights stressed many times that the film is for a family audience, it is anything but that".

References

External links 

 

Films shot in Portugal
Films shot in Hyderabad, India
2019 romantic comedy films
Indian romantic comedy films
2010s Telugu-language films
Indian sequel films
Indian remakes of French films
2019 films
Films scored by Chaitan Bharadwaj